Events from the year 1877 in art.

Events
 January – Claude Monet begins a series of paintings of the Gare Saint-Lazare in Paris.
 April – Third "Exhibition of Impressionists" arranged by Gustave Caillebotte at 6 rue Le Peletier in Paris. 
 May 1 – The Grosvenor Gallery in London opens to the public with an exhibition of paintings created over the past featuring Edward Burne-Jones's Days of Creation, The Beguiling of Merlin and The Mirror of Venus and James McNeill Whistler's Nocturne in Black and Gold – The Falling Rocket. On July 2, English art critic John Ruskin's review in Fors Clavigera praises Burne-Jones but of Whistler says he "never expected to hear a coxcomb ask two hundred guineas for flinging a pot of paint in the public's face" provoking a charge of libel.
 Summer – Frederic Leighton exhibits his bronze Athlete Wrestling with a Python at the Royal Academy of Arts in London, inaugurating a renaissance in contemporary British sculpture which becomes known as the New Sculpture.
 September 6 – The Walker Art Gallery in Liverpool, England, is opened.

Works

Paintings
 Lawrence Alma-Tadema
 Flora: Spring in the Gardens of the Villa Borghese
 A Sculptor's Model
 Jules Bastien-Lepage – At Harvest Time (Tempo di vendemmia)
 Robert Bateman – The Pool of Bethesda
 Frederick Arthur Bridgman – The Funeral Procession of a Mummy on the Nile
 Ford Madox Brown – Cromwell, Protector of the Vaudois
 Gustave Caillebotte
 On the Pont de l’Europe (Kimbell Art Museum)
 Paris Street; Rainy Day ("Rue de Paris; Temps de pluie")
 Les périssoires ("Canoes on the Yerres") (Milwaukee Art Museum)
 Paul Cézanne 
Bathers at Rest (The Barnes Foundation, Philadelphia)
Madame Cézanne in a Red Armchair (Museum of Fine Arts, Boston)
The Eternal Feminine (The J. Paul Getty Museum, Los Angeles)
 Frederic Edwin Church
 The Aegean Sea
 El Rio de Luz
 Alphonse-Marie-Adolphe de Neuville – L'attaque au crépuscule ("The attack at dawn"; Walters Art Museum, Baltimore)
 Thomas Eakins – William Rush Carving His Allegorical Figure of the Schuylkill River (original version; Philadelphia Museum of Art)
 Albert Edelfelt – Queen Blanca
 Henri Fantin-Latour – The Reading
 Carl Fredrik Hill – The Cemetery
 Charles-Gustave Housez – La petite fille perdue dans Paris
 Kobayashi Kiyochika – The Sumida River by Night
 Frederic Leighton
 Mrs Henry Evans Gordon
 The Music Lesson
 Édouard Manet
 Nana
 Woman in Evening Dress (Guggenheim Museum, New York City)
 John Everett Millais
 Effie Deans
 Thomas Carlyle
 Claude Monet – Gare Saint Lazare
 Camille Pissarro
 The Côte des Bœufs at L’Hermitage
 The Garden at Pontoise
 Arthur Quartley – Early Moonlight Naragansett Bay
 Briton Rivière
 Lazarus
 Sympathy
 John Roddam Spencer Stanhope – Love and the Maiden
 James Tissot
 The Gallery of H.M.S. 'Calcutta' (Portsmouth)
 Hide and Seek
 Portsmouth Dockyard
 Julius von Blaas – Fox Hunt in the Campagna
 Anton von Werner – Die Proklamation des Deutschen Kaiserreiches ("The Proclamation of the German Empire", original version; destroyed in World War II)
 James McNeill Whistler
 Harmony in Blue and Gold: The Peacock Room (decorative scheme)
 Nocturne (c. 1875–77, Hunterian Museum and Art Gallery, Glasgow)

Sculpture

 Frederic Leighton – Athlete Wrestling with a Python
 Auguste Rodin – The Age of Bronze
The Defenders of Fort Moultrie

Births
 January 2 – Slava Raškaj, Croatian watercolourist (died 1906)
 January 26 – Kees van Dongen, Dutch-born painter (died 1968)
 February 19 – Gabriele Münter, German painter (died 1962)
 April 15 – Georg Kolbe, German sculptor (died 1947)
 June 3 – Raoul Dufy, French Fauvist painter (died 1953)
 July 2 – Rinaldo Cuneo, American painter (died 1939)
 August 4 – Laura Knight, English Impressionist painter (died 1970)
 August 7 – Leslie Hunter, born George Hunter, Scottish painter (died 1931)
 August 18 – Herbert Barnard John Everett, English marine artist (died 1949)
 December 27 – Adolf Kašpar, Czech painter and illustrator (died 1934)

Deaths
 January 9 – Alexander Brullov, Russian painter, teacher, and architect (born 1798)
 February 13 – Auguste Hüssener, German engraver and miniature painter (born 1789)
 March 31 – Jean Baptiste Madou, painter and lithographer (born 1796)
 June 4 – William Edward Frost, English painter (born 1810)
 August 5 – Philipp Foltz, painter (born 1793)
 September 16 – Marcin Zaleski, Polish painter (born 1796)
 September 17 – William Fox Talbot, pioneer photographer (born 1800)
 November 12 – Henry Peters Gray, portrait painter (born 1819)
 December 18 – Philipp Veit, painter (born 1819)
 December 31 – Gustave Courbet, painter (born 1819)

References

 
Years of the 19th century in art
1870s in art